Meena Singh is an Indian politician from Umaria district in Madhya Pradesh. She belongs to Bhartiya Janata Party and was elected as MLA of Manpur Vidhansabha in Umaria district. She took Oath as a Minister of Tribal Welfare of Madhya Pradesh under CM Shivraj Singh Chauhan's Cabinet formation on 21 April 2020.

References

Living people
People from Umaria district
Madhya Pradesh MLAs 2008–2013
Bharatiya Janata Party politicians from Madhya Pradesh
21st-century Indian women politicians
21st-century Indian politicians
Year of birth missing (living people)
Women members of the Madhya Pradesh Legislative Assembly